White Store Church and Evergreen Cemetery is a national historic district containing a historic meetinghouse and cemetery at the junction of New York State Route 8 and White Store Road, 4 miles south of South New Berlin in Norwich, Chenango County, New York. The district includes two contributing buildings, one contributing site, and seven contributing structures.  The property consists of the cemetery established in 1805 and a Federal style frame church completed in 1820.  Also on the property is a small maintenance shed and privy.  The church is a simple, two story frame structure with a gable roof, measuring 40 feet wide and 46 feet deep. The cemetery contains approximately 400 burials, with the earliest stones dated to 1795.

It was added to the National Register of Historic Places in 1995.

References

External links
 

Churches on the National Register of Historic Places in New York (state)
Historic districts on the National Register of Historic Places in New York (state)
Federal architecture in New York (state)
Churches in Chenango County, New York
Cemeteries in Chenango County, New York
National Register of Historic Places in Chenango County, New York
Cemeteries established in the 1800s